Nasir Adhama (born 8 February 1977) in Kano, Nigeria, is a Nigerian politician and youth activist who currently serves as a Senior Special Assistant to Nigeria's President Muhammadu Buhari on Youth and Student affairs.

Education
Adhama had his primary and secondary education at Kano Capital Primary and Secondary School and thereafter proceeded to study Electrical Electronics engineering at Kano State Polytechnic, earning a Higher National Diploma.

Career
Adhama's involvement in political and student unionism kick started his career in politics. While studying at the Kano State Polytechnic, he was elected the Secretary General of the Student Union Government SUG and later the Secretary General of the National Association of Nigerian Students.

In 2003, he was appointed the Youth Presidential Campaign Committee coordinator of the All Nigeria Peoples Party ANPP Presidential Campaign in charge of North West Nigeria as well as the National coordinator -Youth Organization for Buhari and Okadigbo (YOBO). Nigeria's current President Muhammadu Buhari was the presidential candidate of the party in the 2003 presidential election, while Late Chuba Okadigbo was his running mate. The party lost the election to the People's Democratic Party (Nigeria) PDP. In the 2007 Presidential Election, Nasir was appointed again to serve as the Youth Presidential Campaign Committee coordinator of the ANPP Presidential Campaign.

In March 2010, Nasir joined the Congress for Progressive Change CPC, following the defection of Muhammadu Buhari to the party. In 2011, he was appointed the Youth Leader/Chairman of the party's Presidential Campaign Committee Youth Directorate as well as the Kano State Youth Leader of the party. The CPC later merged with several other parties into the All Progressives Congress in 2013.

Upon the victory of Muhammadu Buhari in the presidential election in the 2015, Nasir was appointed Special Assistant on Youth and Student to the President. In 2016, as part of Nigeria government's effort at addressing the issue of unemployment, he developed a partnership with Huawei Technologies to train 1000 youth in Information Communication Technology across Nigeria.

In 2020, Nasir led the Nigerian Youth Task Force complementing the work of the Presidential Task Force on COVID-19 by deploying its army of volunteers which includes trained medical personnel with vivid knowledge of the pandemic.

Adhama was listed as one of the 100 most influential youth in Nigeria by Avance Media.

References 

1977 births
Living people
Politicians from Kano
All Nigeria Peoples Party politicians